Kunzea calida  is a plant in the myrtle family, Myrtaceae and is endemic to Queensland, Australia. It is a spreading shrub which has linear to lance-shaped leaves but which are rolled, making them appear cylindrical. The flowers are pinkish-purple and arranged in groups near the ends of the branches in September. It is only known in remote and rugged areas of the Mount Stewart Ranges near Homestead.

Description
The leaves are covered with short, silky hairs. The flowers are pinkish-purple and arranged in rounded groups of three to twelve flowers on the ends of the branches. Flowering in occurs September and is followed by fruit which an almost spherical capsule.

Taxonomy and naming
Kunzea calida was first formally described in 1867 by Ferdinand von Mueller and the description was published in Fragmenta phytographiae Australiae. The specific epithet (calida) is a Latin word meaning "warm" or "hot".

Distribution and habitat
The distribution of this kunzea is poorly understood but it occurs in open areas of the Mount Stewart Ranges.

Conservation
Kunzea calida is classified as "Endangered" under the Queensland Nature Conservation Act 1992.

References

calida
Flora of Queensland
Plants described in 1867
Myrtales of Australia
Endemic flora of Australia
Taxa named by Ferdinand von Mueller